John William Alcroft Allen (31 January 1903 – 19 November 1957) was an English professional football forward and outside left, who played in the Football League for Leeds United, Brentford, Sheffield Wednesday, Newcastle United, Bristol Rovers and Gateshead.

Career 
Born in Newcastle-upon-Tyne, he played for his home town club Newcastle United between 1931 and 1934. He played up front as a striker and managed to score 41 goals in 90 appearances for Newcastle. Perhaps the most important of those goals were scored in the 1932 FA Cup Final, in which Newcastle beat Arsenal 2–1 with both goals coming from Allen.

Allen is best remembered for his time at Sheffield Wednesday where he scored 33 goals in both 1928–29 and 1929–30 to help the Owls clinch back-to-back Division One titles.

Allen also played for Leeds United, Brentford, Bristol Rovers and Gateshead in his successful career.

Personal life 
Allen's brother Ralph was also a footballer. His grandson Paul Darling is Chair of the Horserace Betting Levy Board and another grandson Ian Darling is a British circuit judge.

Honours
Sheffield Wednesday
Football League First Division: 1928–29, 1929–30
Newcastle United
FA Cup: 1931–32

References

1903 births
1957 deaths
English footballers
Association football outside forwards
Newcastle United F.C. players
Leeds United F.C. players
Sheffield Wednesday F.C. players
Brentford F.C. players
English Football League players
Bristol Rovers F.C. players
Gateshead A.F.C. players
People from Newburn
Footballers from Tyne and Wear
Ashington A.F.C. players
FA Cup Final players